Trachypepla euryleucota is a species of moth in the family Oecophoridae. It is endemic to New Zealand and can be found throughout the country. They inhabit native forest and the larvae are leaf litter feeders and have also been found feeding on and in bird nests. Adults are on the wing from December to March, are nocturnal and are attracted to light. During the daylight hours they can be sometimes be observed resting on walls or fences. It has been hypothesised that the adults resemble an opening manuka flower bud or bird droppings in order to camouflage themselves from predators. The raised tufts on their forewings possibly also assist with camouflaging this moth when they rest on lichen.

Taxonomy 

This species was first described by Edward Meyrick in 1883 using specimens collected in Auckland, Wellington and Dunedin. Meyrick gave a more detailed description of the species in a paper published in May 1884.  George Hudson discussed and illustrated this species in his 1928 publication The Butterflies and Moths of New Zealand. The type locality of this species is the Botanic Garden and forest in Wellington. The lectotype specimen is held at the Natural History Museum, London.

Description 
Meyrick described the species as follows:

Distribution 
This species is endemic to New Zealand and is found throughout the country.

Habitat and hosts 

T. euryleucota inhabit native forest.  Larvae are leaf litter feeders and have also been found feeding on bird nest debris.

Biology and behaviour 
Adults are on the wing from December to March. Adults are nocturnal and are attracted to light. During the daytime they have been collected resting on human made structures such as walls and fences. They have also been collected when manuka are in flower. It has been hypothesised that the adults of this species imitate an opening manuka flower bud when at rest, thus camouflaging themselves. It has also been suggested that their colouring is similar to bird droppings and that the raised tufts on their forewings assist in providing camouflage when resting on lichens.

References

External links 

Image of lectotype specimen

Oecophorinae
Moths of New Zealand
Endemic fauna of New Zealand
Taxa named by Edward Meyrick
Moths described in 1883
Endemic moths of New Zealand